The Austrian Women's Basketball Bundesliga (English Austrian Women Basketball League AWBL) is the highest basketball league in Austria.

History

Current season teams (2013–2014)

Champions

List of champions

External links
 Austrian Women's Basketball Bundesliga at eurobasket.com

Austria
Women's basketball in Austria
Sports leagues established in 1948
Women
1948 establishments in Austria
Professional sports leagues in Austria